Sir Charles Barrow, 1st Baronet (1707–89), of Hygrove, Minsterworth, Gloucestershire, was an English politician.

Biography
Barrow was born in 1708 at St. Christopher and was the son of merchant Charles Barrow and Elizabeth Harris.  He graduated from Oxford University, England, in 1754 with a Doctor of Civil Law (D.C.L..).

He held the office of Recorder of Tewkesbury and the office of Member (MP) for Gloucester November 1751 and 1789.  He was created 1st Baronet Barrow, of Highgrove, Gloucester Great Britain on 22 January 1784, with a special remainder to Thomas Crawley-Boevey.

He lived at Hygrove House, Minsterworth, Gloucestershire, England. He married Mary Randall, the daughter of Daniel Randall of Gloucester and had an illegitimate daughter named Mary Caroline Barrow. The baronetcy passed to Thomas Crawley-Boevey, husband of his brother's granddaughter.

References

1707 births
1789 deaths
People from Cotswold District
Baronets in the Baronetage of Great Britain
British MPs 1747–1754
British MPs 1761–1768
British MPs 1768–1774
British MPs 1774–1780
British MPs 1780–1784
British MPs 1784–1790
Members of the Parliament of Great Britain for English constituencies